Justin Gerard Rennicks (born March 20, 1999) is an American professional soccer player who plays as a forward for Major League Soccer club New England Revolution.

Career

College and amateur
Rennicks was born in South Hamilton, Massachusetts, and played his college career at Indiana University between 2017 and 2018, making 29 appearances, scoring nine goals and tallying one assist.

Rennicks also played for USL Premier Development League side Boston Bolts in both their 2017 and 2018 seasons.

Professional
On January 18, 2019, Rennicks opted to leave college early and signed a Homegrown Player contract with Major League Soccer side New England Revolution. Rennicks made his professional debut on March 9, 2019, appearing as a half-time substitute in a 2–0 loss to Columbus Crew SC.

On August 1, 2019, Rennicks joined USL Championship side North Carolina FC on loan for the remainder of the season.

On September 12, 2020, Rennicks joined USL League One affiliate New England Revolution II on loan for the remainder of the season. He made his debut on September 16 and scored his first goal for the club three days later against Union Omaha.

On April 9, 2022 Rennicks scored his first MLS goal, redirecting a DeJuan Jones cross past Inter Miami CF's Nick Marsman in the 11th minute of the match.

Career statistics

Club

Honors
United States U20
CONCACAF U-20 Championship: 2018

References

External links
 

Living people
1999 births
American soccer players
Association football forwards
Boston Bolts players
Homegrown Players (MLS)
Indiana Hoosiers men's soccer players
Major League Soccer players
MLS Next Pro players
New England Revolution players
New England Revolution II players
North Carolina FC players
People from Hamilton, Massachusetts
Sportspeople from Essex County, Massachusetts
Soccer players from Massachusetts
United States men's youth international soccer players
USL League One players
USL League Two players
United States men's under-20 international soccer players